Starmaker is a compilation album of phonograph records by Tommy Dorsey, featuring collaborations between Dorsey and artists his band had a role in making popular. These include musicians such as Buddy Rich, composers and arrangers such as Sy Oliver, and vocalists like Frank Sinatra and Jo Stafford. It was released as a part of the Victor Musical Smart Set series.

Reception
The songs in Starmaker were advertised in Billboard magazine as "some of the swellest songs [the big money stars] ever made with Tommy". According to Joel Whitburn, the highest-charting song of the set was "Oh! Look At Me Now", which stayed at number 2 for six weeks and charted for a total of twelve, peaking in March 1941.

Track listing
These previously issued songs were featured on a 4-disc, 78 rpm album set, Victor P-150.

Disc 1: (20-1576)

Disc 2: (20-1577)

Disc 3: (20-1578)

Disc 4: (20-1579)

References

RCA Victor compilation albums
1944 albums
Tommy Dorsey albums